Mchomolo is a village in  the Ruvuma Region of southwestern Tanzania. It is located along the A19 road, to the southeast of  Masaguro.

References

External links
Maplandia

Populated places in Ruvuma Region